Kendrick School is a selective girls' grammar school situated in the centre of Reading, Berkshire, UK. In  February 2011, Kendrick became an Academy.

History

The school is named after John Kendrick, a Reading cloth merchant who died in 1624. John Kendrick left the then substantial charitable bequest of £12,500 to the towns of Reading and Newbury to provide employment and education for the poor. Initially this was used to provide a house of industry, or workhouse, called The Oracle, a name that was revived for the Oracle shopping mall which now occupies the site.

In later years the funds left by Kendrick were mismanaged and subject to legal challenge. In the 1870s this was resolved, and the remaining bequest used to found Kendrick Girls' School, along with the Kendrick Boys' School that was later to merge with Reading School. An oil painting of John Kendrick, rescued from the Oracle workhouse, still hangs in the hall at Kendrick School. The caption reads "John Kendrick, founder of this workhouse".

The school in its current form was founded in 1877 and occupied Watlington House in Watlington Street for the first 50 years of its life. In 1927, the school moved to its current site, situated on the corner of Sidmouth Street and London Road. The building is a Grade II listed building. The school was originally known as "Kendrick Girls' School" but is now called "Kendrick School".

The current Headmistress is Christine Kattirtzi. She replaced Marsha Elms at the end of the Spring Term, 2012.

Academic performance
Kendrick School has an outstanding Ofsted rating, and has a progress 8 score "well above national average".
Pupils are selected on the basis of academic ability via an admissions test at age 11 (although entry is possible in other years too). The school was among the top five grammar schools in the UK based on GCSE performance in 2018, and in 2019.

In July 2011, Kendrick School was identified by the Sutton Trust as the fifth highest state school for proportion of higher education applicants accepted at Oxford and Cambridge Universities. The report found that 15.2% of pupils were accepted to Oxbridge and 79.4% were accepted to the highly selective Sutton Trust 30 universities over the previous three years.
A 2016 report also ranked Kendrick among the top 10 state schools in Oxbridge admissions. As a state-funded school, there are no fees; as a result, it is severely over-subscribed, with over ten applicants per place.

House System
The Kendrick House system consists of three houses: Cedars, Sidmouth and Palmer House. Each house is assigned a colour and animal, as follows: Cedars — blue seal (Cedars seals), Sidmouth — yellow squid (Sidmouth squidmouth) and Palmer — green llama (Palmer llama).

Notable former pupils

Anne Treisman, cognitive psychologist
Beryl Cook, artist
Chi-chi Nwanoku, musician
Janet Reger, lingerie designer
Rosi Sexton, retired professional Mixed Martial Artist and first British female to fight in the UFC
Yasmina Siadatan, winner of the BBC television series, The Apprentice in 2009.
Jessica Swale, theatre director and playwright
Claire Taylor, England cricketer
Wendy Tan White, technology entrepreneur 
Imogen Rose Hart, Producer Luanna the Podcast 
Adhya Shastry, winner of the BBC television series, BBC Young Dancer, in 2022

See also
 The Abbey School, Reading, a girls' independent school
 Reading School, a boys' grammar school
 Reading Abbey Girls' School, a school attended by Jane Austen

References

External links

Kendrick School website
Kendrick Parents Society website
Kendrick Sports Clubs

Girls' schools in Berkshire
Grammar schools in Reading, Berkshire
Educational institutions established in 1877
Grade II listed buildings in Reading
1877 establishments in England
Academies in Reading, Berkshire